Lacaena is a genus of orchids native to Central America, Colombia and southern Mexico. At present (June 2014), only two species are recognized:

Lacaena bicolor Lindl. - Central America, Colombia and southern Mexico
Lacaena spectabilis (Klotzsch) Rchb.f. - from Chiapas to Panama

References

External links

Stanhopeinae genera
Stanhopeinae